Seelitz is a municipality in the district of Mittelsachsen, in Saxony, Germany. It is part of the administrative partnership  based in the eponymous town.

Geography 

The village of Seelitz is situated about 2 km south-east of Rochlitz and 13 km north-east of Mittweida, above the river Zwickauer Mulde. The following communities have been incorporated:

History

Local history 

Seelitz and the neighbouring villages are of Slavic origin. Although there is no written evidence, this is proven by archeological finds, mostly pottery shards, by Slavic burgwalls such as those near Fischheim and Köttern, by the names of populated places and landscape features, and by the layout and size of the historic land parcels in the communities.

The place is first mentioned in writing as Seliz in an 1174 deed of donation, according to which margrave Dedo the Fat of Lusatia gave four Hufen of Land in Seelitz to the newly founded Zschillen monastery.

The spelling of the place name has changed little since then:
 1174: Seliz
 1205 and 1378: Selicz
 1489: Zelitcz
 1548: Selietz
 1791: Seelitz

The name had Old Sorbian origins, but its original meaning is unclear. It may be derived from a person's name Želidrog, shortened to Žel, or from zel, which means 'green'

During the Thirty Years' War and in later conflicts Seelitz suffered from marauding troops and epidemics.

Seelitz belonged administratively to Amt Rochlitz. Since the population of the neighbouring villages had to attend church services in Seelitz, it became an ecclesiastical centre of the region.

Following the incorporation of other communities during the 20th century, Seelitz now has 24 constituent parts.

Ecclesiastical history 

The parish of Seelit was formed around the year 1000 and became part of the diocese of Meißen, after the country around Rochlitz had been occupied by German settlers who had come from Franconia. By this time, the Sorbian population had formally converted to Christianity. Violent acts in connection with the Christian mission are not reported from this area.

The lapidary inscriptions of the year dates 1516 and 1529 on the village church St Anna indicate that at this time a romanesque church dating from the 11th century had been replaced by the extant hall church in late gothic style.

Around 1430 Seelitz suffered from the invasion of Hussitic troops, during which time the church was destroyed. Seelitz joined the Protestant Reformation comparatively early, the local school which was erected in 1527 was probably already Protestant from the beginning.

From 1769 to 1761, the local church was rebuilt in baroque style under the direction of Wiederau carpenter Michael Mäßig and was fitted with matronea. Altar and pulpit (1770/1771) as well as the baptismal font in rococo style were made by Penig sculptor Johann Gottfried Stecher (1718–1776).

Over time, Seelitz became a regional ecclesiastical centre, and with 23 constituting villages it forms the largest territorial parish in Saxony.

Municipal council 
The communal elections in Saxony on 25 May 2014 resulted in the following distribution of seats in the municipal council:
 Bürgerbewegung Kirche (BBW): 8 seats (46.7% of votes)
 Bürgergemeinschaft FFw (BG FFw): 3 seats (21.2%)
 LINKE: 2 seats (17.1%)
 CDU: 1 seat (10.2%)
 SPD: no seat (4.7%)
 total: 14 seats
Voter turnout was 57.4%.

Sights 

 St. Anna church
 Rochlitzer Berg
 Valley of Zwickauer Mulde
 Fischheimer Borstel and Kötterner Porschel, Slavic burgwalls, built around the year 1000
 former sand pit Biesern: recreational water body for bathing and fishing

Infrastructure 

The eastern part of the communal area is crossed by Bundesstraße 107, the northern part by Bundesstraße 175 (section between Rochlitz and Geringswalde). The railway lines Glauchau–Großbothen and Waldheim–Rochlitz with stations in Steudten and Döhlen, respectively, have been closed down in 2002 and 1998. The official bicycle route Mulderadweg passes through Seelitz.

Literature  
 William Clemens Pfau: Grundzüge der älteren Geschichte des Dorfes Seelitz und seiner Kirche. Verlag Bode, 1902.
 Neue Sächsische Kirchengalerie. Band: Die Parochie Seelitz. Verlag Strauch, Leipzig 1909. (Digitalisat)

External links 

 
  Official home page
 
  History of Seelitz church

References 

Mittelsachsen